Haplogaster is a genus of beetles in the family Carabidae, containing the following species:

 Haplogaster ampliata H. W. Bates, 1892
 Haplogaster elongata Banninger, 1932
 Haplogaster granulipennis Balkenohl, 1994
 Haplogaster himalayicus Banninger, 1935
 Haplogaster manipurensis Banninger, 1932
 Haplogaster mollita H. W. Bates, 1892
 Haplogaster ovatus Chaudoir, 1879
 Haplogaster rugosus Landin, 1955
 Haplogaster wardi Andrewes, 1929

References

Scaritinae